Nobbys Creek is a town located in north-eastern New South Wales, Australia, in the Tweed Shire.

Demographics

The median age of the Nobbys Creek population was 46 years, 9 years above the national median of 37.

78.2% of people living in Nobbys Creek were born in Australia. The other top responses for country of birth were England 2.5%, France 1.8%, Egypt 1.8%, New Zealand 1.8%, South Africa 1.5%, 9.4% other countries.

87% of people spoke only English at home; the next most common languages were 1.8% Greek, 1.4% German, 1.1% Punjabi, 1.1% Danish, 5.4% other languages.

References 

Suburbs of Tweed Heads, New South Wales